Isopogon crithmifolius is a species of plant in the family Proteaceae and is endemic to the south-west of Western Australia. It is a shrub with divided leaves and more or less spherical heads of glabrous reddish pink flowers.

Description
Flowering occurs from September to October and the fruit is a hairy oval nut, fused with others in a spherical cone  in diameter.

Taxonomy
Isopogon crithmifolius was first formally described in 1868 by Ferdinand von Mueller in Fragmenta phytographiae Australiae from specimens collected by James Drummond.

Distribution and habitat
This isopogon grows in forest and woodland from near Perth to near Cranbrook in the Avon Wheatbelt, Jarrah Forest and Swan Coastal Plain biogeographic regions in the south-west of Western Australia.

Conservation status
Isopogon crithmifolius is classified as "not threatened" by the Government of Western Australia Department of Parks and Wildlife.

References

crithmifolius
Eudicots of Western Australia
Plants described in 1868
Taxa named by Ferdinand von Mueller